Malapterurus tanganyikaensis is a species of electric catfish native to Lake Tanganyika where it occurs in the bordering nations of Burundi, the Democratic Republic of the Congo, Tanzania and Zambia.  This species grows to a length of  SL.

References
 

Malapteruridae
Freshwater fish of Africa
Fish of Burundi
Fish of the Democratic Republic of the Congo
Fish of Tanzania
Fish of Zambia
Taxa named by Tyson R. Roberts
Fish described in 2000
Strongly electric fish